The Black Bull, formerly known as the Black Bull Inn and Black Bull Hotel, is a public house in Preesall, Lancashire, England. Dating to 1762, it stands on Park Lane.

The inn's first licensee was John Bamber, who ran it between 1776 and 1789. Between 1853 and 1892, the role was filled by John Parkinson. In 1872, during Parkinson's tenure, a "syndicate of men" from Barrow-in-Furness stayed at the inn during their search for iron ore in the area. None was to be found, but they did discover a bed of rock salt, from which they took a sample. Upon returning to the inn, Parkinson's 17-year-old daughter, Dorothy, processed the sample by dissolving, filtering and boiling it, thus creating the very first example of Preesall salt. In 1902, Preesall Salt Works was built to the north of the village's salt marshes, on the eastern banks of the River Wyre. Dorothy married another John Parkinson and spent her life as a farmer's wife at Hackensall Hall Farm, where she raised nine children. She died in 1925.

The current licensee took over in late 2022, succeeding Anthony Gills.

References

External links

1762 establishments in England
Buildings and structures in the Borough of Wyre
Pubs in Lancashire
Hotels in Lancashire